Marty Angelo worked in the entertainment business from 1965 to 1980 as a television producer (Disco Step-by-Step), record promoter, restaurant/nightclub owner and personal manager for rock 'n' roll bands (Raven  and Rob Grill and The Grass Roots).

After a drug arrest in 1980 for cocaine possession, he served two years of a six-year federal prison sentence, and in prison began a ministry, Marty Angelo Ministries. Upon his early release from prison in 1984, Angelo went on to work with various ministries such as, Faith Farm in southern Florida, Teen Challenge of Southern California, Prison Fellowship, and the Drug Abuse Foundation of Palm Beach County. Angelo is also the author of ten books.

Marty Angelo’s Once Life Matters Ministries, Inc. reached out to prisons/jails, rehabs, college campuses, troubled celebrities, politicians and to members of the military from 1981-2018. 

Angelo officially retired in September of 2018.

References

External links

 Amazon’s Author’s Page

American television producers
Living people
Year of birth missing (living people)
Place of birth missing (living people)